George Edmund Badger (April 17, 1795May 11, 1866) was a slave owner and Whig U.S. senator from the state of North Carolina.

Early life
Badger was born on April 17, 1795, in New Bern, North Carolina. He attended Yale College (where he was a member of Brothers in Unity) and received a partial college education that was terminated due to lack of funds; afterwards, he studied law and was admitted to the bar in 1814.

Career
Badger practiced law in North Carolina, was active in state politics, and served as a state superior court judge. A supporter of Andrew Jackson from the 1820s, he separated with him in the mid-1830s, became a leader of the Whig party and helped carry the Whigs to victory in the 1840 Presidential election.

Upon taking office, President William Henry Harrison appointed Badger as his Secretary of the Navy, and he continued in that post for a few months (until September 1841, when he resigned to resume private practice) when John Tyler succeeded to the Presidency upon Harrison's death (April 1841). Badger's brief term as Secretary was marked by efforts to strengthen the Navy in the face of tension with Great Britain, the establishment of the U.S. Home Squadron, and growing interest in steamships.

Badger resigned in September 1841, during a general cabinet shakeup. The resignation of several cabinet members, including Badger, resulted from Tyler's vetoing of two bills to create a new national bank, which the Whig party, led by Henry Clay, supported. Badger was elected to the U.S. Senate in 1846 to fill the unexpired term of William Henry Haywood, Jr. and remained in office until 1855, after choosing not to run for re-election. While in the Senate, he supported the Compromise of 1850.

He was nominated by President Millard Fillmore as an Associate justice of the Supreme Court on January 3, 1853, to succeed John McKinley. On February 11, 1853, the Senate voted to table a nomination, and the president withdrew it three days later. 

Badger's wealth grew throughout his political career; by 1860, he was worth an estimated $145,000. He was a slave owner, enslaving twenty people. He was a Unionist during the secession crisis but thereafter supported the Confederate war effort.

Death and legacy
Badger died in Raleigh, North Carolina, in 1866.

Two Navy ships have been named in honor of Senator Badger: USS George E. Badger (DD-196), and USS Badger (FF-1071).  A Liberty ship, the SS George E. Badger, also was named in his honor. Badger was a cousin of naval officers Oscar C. Badger, Charles J. Badger and Oscar C. Badger II.

References

External links

George Edmund Badger entry at The Political Graveyard

George E. Badger at Naval Historical Center

|-

|-

1795 births
1866 deaths
Politicians from New Bern, North Carolina
American people of English descent
United States Secretaries of the Navy
William Henry Harrison administration cabinet members
Tyler administration cabinet members
Whig Party United States senators from North Carolina
North Carolina Whigs
Members of the North Carolina House of Representatives
Unsuccessful nominees to the United States Supreme Court
North Carolina state court judges
North Carolina lawyers
Yale College alumni